Thomas Bish (5 May 1779 – 27 December 1842) was a British politician.

Bish worked as a stockbroker and held a government contract for the lottery.  At the 1826 UK general election, he stood in Leominster as a Whig.  He was elected, but was unseated on an election petition, due to the contract he held.

The lottery was abolished in 1826, and this enabled Bish to stand again in Leominster at the 1832 UK general election, winning the seat.  In Parliament, he opposed the Corn Law, and supported a secret ballot and shorter Parliamentary terms.  He argued that the Bank of England should manufacture their banknotes in a manner which made them harder to forge, and that Parliament and the Court should sometimes meet in Dublin.  He also argued for the revival of the state lottery, arguing that since its abolition, many British citizens instead put money into lotteries based overseas.

Bish held his seat at the 1835 UK general election, but stood down in 1837.

References

1779 births
1842 deaths
UK MPs 1826–1830
UK MPs 1832–1835
UK MPs 1835–1837
Whig (British political party) MPs for English constituencies